Amir Shahi Sabzavari (also spelled Sabzevari, Sabzawari; died 1453) was a Persian poet who flourished in 15th-century Timurid Iran. He was descended from the Sarbadars of Sabzevar.

He composed a response to the opening ghazal of Hafez's divan. He died in Astarabad (present-day Gorgan), and was buried in the family shrine in Sabzevar.

References

Year of birth unknown
1453 deaths
Sarbadars
Poets from the Timurid Empire
15th-century Persian-language poets
Burials in Iran
15th-century Iranian writers
People from Sabzevar